This is a list of seasons of the Swedish Hockey League (SHL) (formerly named Elitserien) since the league was inaugurated in the 1975–76 season.

Seasons

As Elitserien 
1975–76 |
1976–77 |
1977–78 |
1978–79 |
1979–80 |
1980–81 |
1981–82 |
1982–83 |
1983–84 |
1984–85 |
1985–86 |
1986–87 |
1987–88 |
1988–89 |
1989–90 |
1990–91 |
1991–92 |
1992–93 |
1993–94 |
1994–95 |
1995–96 |
1996–97 |
1997–98 |
1998–99 |
1999–2000 |
2000–01 |
2001–02 |
2002–03 |
2003–04 |
2004–05 |
2005–06 |
2006–07 |
2007–08 |
2008–09 |
2009–10 |
2010–11 |
2011–12 |
2012–13

As Swedish Hockey League 
2013–14 |
2014–15 |
2015–16 |
2016–17 |
2017–18 |
2018–19 |
2019–20 |
2020–21 |
2021–22 |
2022–23

See also 
Marathon SHL standings
List of Swedish ice hockey champions

External links